Pallavas ruled in Thondai Nadu northern part of Tamil country. The period of Pallava rule was 600 CE to 900 CE. Early studies about Pallava coins were made by Sir Walter Elliot (1858), T. Desikachary (1933), C.Minaksi (1938), and S.Ramayya (1967).
  
The Pallava coins were minted in lead, copper and bronze. Silver and gold coins are not yet discovered, but in Pallava inscriptions there is a note about gold coins. The coins were mostly round, and a very few were square. They weigh about 0.450 to 9.8 grams and size is about 1 cm to 2.5 cm. The basic symbols in Pallava coins are bull and lion. The bull is the royal emblem of Pallavas and the emblem of Lord Siva. Apart from bull and lion, symbols like svastika, cakra, flag, twin masted ship, elephant and crescent were also seen in Pallava coins.

External links
The Hindu book review on The Pallava Coins by R. Krishnamurthy
Pallava coins on Tamil net

Ancient currencies
Pallava dynasty
Economic history of Tamil Nadu
Coins of India